A list of compositions by the Renaissance composer, publisher, and instrumentalist, Tielman Susato.

Instrumental music 
Danserye (1551)Dance No. 1
Dance No. 2
Dance No. 3
Dance No. 4
Dance No. 5
Dance No. 6
Dance No. 7
Dance No. 8
Dance No. 9
Dance No. 10
Dance No. 11
Dance No. 12
Dance No. 13
Ronde No. 1
Ronde No. 2
Ronde No. 3
Ronde No. 4
Ronde No. 5
Ronde No. 6
Dont vientcela
Vostre gent corps
Loing de tes jeulx
La rosee du mois de may
Sans avoir aultre
Trop a regretz
Je my leuay par ung matin
Damours me plains
Situte plains
Pis ne me peult venir
Ioyeulx recueil
Sans la veoir cotent estre
Le content est riche
Plaisir vay plus
Cuidez vous que dieu nous
Ungiour viendra
Mille regretz
Craite & Espoir moppressent
Qui belles amours a
Accordez moy
Dargent me plains
Languir me fais en douleur
Le bergier & la bergiere
Tous mes amis
Si par souffrir
Puis quen januier
The Battle PavaneLuculentum theatrum musicum (1568 - A compilation of pieces by various composers)

For solo lute
Fantasia prima. R. Viola
Fantasia. Simon Gintzler
Fantasia. Antonio Rotta
Fantasia. Giovanni Paolo Paladino
Fantasia. Guillaume Morlaye
Fantasia. Giovanni Paolo Paladino
Fantasia. Guillaume Morlaye
Fantasia. Francesco da Milano
Fantasia. Giovanni Paolo Paladino
Fantasia. Francesco da Milano
Fantasia. Giovanni Maria da Crema
Fantasia. Francesco da Milano
Fantasia. Guillaume Morlaye
Fantasia. Francesco da Milano
Fantasia. Francesco da Milano
Fantasia.
Fantasia. Bálint Bakfark
Fantasia. Francesco da Milano
Fantasia. Francesco da Milano
Fantasia. Francesco da Milano
Fantasia. Luys de Narváez
O combien est. Doubtful Sandrin or Claudin de Sermisy
Le mal qui sent.
Vous perdés temps. Claudin de Sermisy
Telz en mesdict. Mittantier
Doulce me-moire. Sandrin
Finy le bien. Pierre Certon
C'est a grand tort. Thomas Crecquillon
Languyr me fais. Claudin de Sermisy
Si mon traveil. Sandrin
Le dueil yssu. Pierre de Villiers
Toutes les nuyct. Thomas Crecquillon
Mais languyrai-je. Jacobus Clemens non Papa
Qu'est il besoing
Fault il qu'il soit
Cessez mes yeux. Thomas Crecquillon
Le content est riche. Claudin de Sermisy
Je prens en gré. Jacobus Clemens non Papa
Un gay bergier. Thomas Crecquillon
Dolci suspiri
Pour un plaisir. Thomas Crecquillon
Si de present. Tielman Susato
Venez venez.
Je suis desheritée. Doubtful Lupus or Pierre Cadéac
Damour me plains. Rogier Pathie
Ce mois de may. Godard
Canzon Mapolitano in tolledo.
Sur la verdure.
Or demourez.
Mamye un jour. Pierre Certon
Si purti guardo. Rogier Pathie
Godt es mijn licht. Jacobus Clemens non Papa
Responce.
Susanne ung jour. Didier Lupi Second
Que pleust a dieu. Verjus
Si de nouveau. Joanne Verius
Fortune allors. Pierre Certon
Pour une helas. Thomas Crecquillon
Tuta tutta saressa.
Quando io penso al martire. Jacob Arcadelt
O faccia puita mia.
Martin menoit. Jacobus Clemens non Papa
Anchor che col partire. Cipriano de Rore
Si tu non mi voi.
O sio potessi donna. Jacquet de Berchem
La pastorella mia. Jacob Arcadelt
Frisque et gaillard. Jacobus Clemens non Papa
Adieu madame par amour.
A demy mort. Jacobus Clemens non Papa
Amour au ceur. Thomas Crecquillon
Si me tenez. Thomas Crecquillon
Or il ne m'est possible. Jacobus Clemens non Papa
Misericorde. Jacobus Clemens non Papa
Avecque vous. Orlande de Lassus
Ardant amour. Orlande de Lassus
Vray dieu disoit. Orlande de Lassus
Du corps absnet. Orlande de Lassus
En espoir vis. Orlande de Lassus
En un leiu. Orlande de Lassus
Bon jour mon ceur. Orlande de Lassus
Las voulez vous/Alio modo. Orlande de Lassus
Un doulx neny. Orlande de Lassus
Ce faux amour. Orlande de Lassus
O comme heureux. Orlande de Lassus
La giustitia immortale. Cipriano de Rore
Donna ch'ornata sete. Cipriano de Rore
L'inconstantia channo. Cipriano de Rore
Se'l mio sempre per voi. Cipriano de Rore
Non gemme non fin oro. Cipriano de Rore
Sous-pirs ardans. Jacob Arcadelt
Si la dureza. Jacob Arcadelt
Carita di signore. Cipriano de Rore
Per pianto la mia carne. Orlande de Lassus
Io cantrei d'amor. Cipriano de Rore
Di tem-po in tempo. Cipriano de Rore
Signor mio caro. Cipriano de Rore
Qual è piu grand'o amore. Cipriano de Rore
Non e ch'il duol mi scena. Cipriano de Rore
A'i trepida. Jacob Arcadelt
Or vien sa mamye. Clément Janequin
La bella mita. Cipriano de Rore
Qual anima. Nollet
Non at sua amante. Bartolomeo Tromboncino
Vita della mia vita. Philippe Verdelot
Pensa domi quel giorno.
Dormiendo i giorno. Philippe Verdelot
Pis ne me peult venir. Thomas Crecquillon
Susanne un jour/Alio modo/plus diminuée. Orlande de Lassus
Je ne desire aymer. Thomas Crecquillon
Tristitia obsedit me. Heinrich Isaac
Descendit angelus.
Paterpeccavi. Jacobus Clemens non Papa
Stabat mater dolorosa. Josquin Desprez
Benedicta es. Josquin Desprez
For two lutes
Canti di voi le ladi. Hubert Naich 
Amor e gratioso. 
Burato. 
La Bataille. Clément Janequin 
Passomezo. 
Il suo saltarello. 
Chi passa. Filippo Azzaiolo 
O combien est. Doubtful Sandrin or Claudin de Sermisy 
Passomezo d'ytalye.
For solo lute
Passomezo d'Italye. 
Passomezo. 
Passomezo. Nicolas Rans 
Gailliarda. Nicolas Rans 
Passomezo de Marck Antoine. 
Passomezo d'Ytalye. 
Gailliarda. 
Gailliarda. 
Passemezo d'Ytalye. 
La Gailliarde. 
Passomezo d'Ytalye. 
Contratenor. 
Passemezo Bassus. 
La Gailliarda. 
Padoana 'Romanisca'. 
La Gailliarda. 
Gailliarda 'La Royne d'Ecosse'. 
Gailliarda de Meller. 
'Chi passa'.
Gailliarda 'La Massengiere'. 
Gailliarda. 
Gailliarda 'La Vergiliana'. 
Gailliarda 'Si pour t'aymer'. 
Gailliarda 'Morette'. 
Gailliarda 'La Varionessa'. 
Gailliarda 'Brunette'. 
Gailliarda 'Wij sal mij troetelen'. 
Gailliarda 'Baisons nous belle'. 
Almande de Ungrie. 
Almande de Spiers. 
Almande 'Noseroit on dire' et reprinse. 
Almande 'Philippine' et reprinse. 
Almande 'de la rocha el fuso'. 
Almande 'smeechdelijn' et reprinse. 
Almande. 
Almande 'Nonette'. 
Almande 'Pouloingne' et reprinse. 
Brandt Champaigne. 
Branles des Bourgoignes. 
Branles des Bourgoignes. 
Branles des Bourgoignes. 
Branles des Bourgoignes. 
Branles des Bourgoignes. 
Branles des Bourgoignes. 
Branles des Bourgoignes. 
Branles des Bourgoignes. 
Branles des Bourgoignes. 
Bransles. Nicolas Rans

3 Dances
Ronde
Pavane "si pa souffrir"
Saltarelle (Also known as "The Hupfauf")

Danza de Hércules

Susato Suite
Nachtanz Das ist ein hartes Scheiden
Ronde Es war einmal ein Mädchen
Schaefertanz Ohne Fels

Choral music

Chansons 
Le premier Livre des chansons à deux ou à troix parties (1544)
De jour en jour
Longtemps y a
De mon malheur
Se dire je l'osoye

L'Unziesme Livre contenant 29 Chansons Amoureuses (1549)

Masses

Motets

References

Susato